Richard George Felt (March 4, 1933 – November 17, 2012) was an American football defensive back who played college football at Brigham Young University (BYU) and professionally in the American Football League (AFL) for the New York Titans and the Boston Patriots. He scored the winning touchdown for the Titans against the Buffalo Bills in the Thanksgiving Day game of November 23, 1961.  Felt was a two-time AFL All-Star selection.

See also
 List of American Football League players

References

1933 births
2012 deaths
American football defensive backs
American Football League players
Boston Patriots players
BYU Cougars football coaches
BYU Cougars football players
New York Titans (AFL) players
American Football League All-Star players
People from Lehi, Utah
Coaches of American football from Utah
Players of American football from Utah